Ogechukwukanmawes Ogwo is a Nigerian broadcaster and radio presenter who currently works as a presenter at Brila FM as a sports analyst after a stint with Raypower FM.she has been a radio presenter for more than 12 years. She started off with a programme called ‘Straight from the Heart’ in RayPower FM radio in April 2002. She then became a presenter anchoring other programmes like the ‘Top 10 Countdown Show’ and ‘Rock Radio’. 
In August, 2003, she auditioned for, and got a job with Brila 98.9 FM radio station in Lagos Nigeria. Ogwo hosted different programmes in Brila FM including ‘Whistles Of The Night’, ‘The Afternoon Blazing Drive’, ‘Top 8 Countdown’, ‘The Sunday Morning Show’ and ‘The Super Morning show’. She has hosted top Nigerian entertainment celebrities in these programmes like Tuface, DBanj, Don Jazzy Ali baba, Mike Ezuruonye, Rita Dominic, Olamide, Kenny & D1, Omawumi among others. She moved into sports broadcasting and hosted some sport shows like ‘The afternoon show’, ‘The Lunch Hour Sports Cruise’, and ‘Saturday Breakfast Show’. Sports celebrities that participated in her show include Obafemi Martins, John Fashanu, Taiye Taiwo and Abedi Pele.
 
She is a recipient of the Nigerian Broadcasters Merit Awards after she won the female categories of the "Most Popular Sports Radio Presenter" and "Best Sportscaster on Radio" in 2012 and 2016 respectively.

See also
 List of Igbo people
 List of Nigerian media personalities
List of radio stations in Nigeria
 Brila FM

References

Nigerian radio presenters
Nigerian women radio presenters
Nigerian journalists
Nigerian women journalists
Living people
Brila FM presenters
Nigerian radio journalists
Women radio journalists
Year of birth missing (living people)